Suresh Eriyat, popularly known as E. Suresh, is an Indian animator, director and founder of his animation studio Studio Eeksaurus. His filmTokri won National Film Award for Best Non-Feature Animation Film.

He started his animation career with Famous House of Animation. He was the first to launch clay animation commercials in India. He created Amaron battery advertisements, music video Bindu re Bindu, the Simpu series for Channel V, MTV Poga series, Johnny Bravo goes to Bollywood, Levis Slim vs. Slim, Google Tanjore paintings and many more things.

References 

Year of birth missing (living people)
Living people
Indian businesspeople
Indian film directors
Indian founders